Philip Hewland (12 December 1876, Gravesend, Kent, England – 1953, Ealing, London) was a British actor. He had one son Ivor and a granddaughter Domini.

Selected filmography
 The Christian (1915)
 His Daughter's Dilemma (1916)
 Arsène Lupin (1916)
 The Manxman (1916)
 The March Hare (1919)
 I Will (1919)
 Whosoever Shall Offend (1919)
 Not Guilty (1919)
 Lady Tetley's Decree (1920)
 The Scarlet Kiss (1920)
 Duke's Son (1920)
 The Breed of the Treshams (1920)
 Kissing Cup's Race (1920)
 The Golden Dawn (1921)
 Dangerous Lies (1921)
 In Full Cry (1921)
 Her Penalty (1921)
 A Couple of Down and Outs (1923)
 The Money Habit (1924)
 The Guns of Loos (1928)
 Love's Option (1928)
 Alf's Carpet (1929)
 Harmony Heaven (1930)
 Tons of Money (1930)
 Glamour (1931)
 The Sleeping Cardinal (1931)
 Many Waters (1931)
 The Missing Rembrandt (1932)
 Marooned (1933)
 Murder by Rope (1936)

References

External links

1876 births
1953 deaths
English male film actors
English male silent film actors
People from Gravesend, Kent
20th-century English male actors